Eoin Ó Gnímh, Irish poet and manuscript collector, fl. December 1699.

Ó Gnímh was a member of a hereditary learned family based at Larne, County Antrim, who had been bard for the O'Neills. 

He was responsible for preserveing a number of manuscripts compiled or collected by Dubhaltach Mac Fhirbhisigh.

See also

 Fear Flatha Ó Gnímh

References

 The Celebrated Antiquary, p. 196, Nollaig Ó Muraíle, Maynooth, 1996.

Irish-language poets
People from County Antrim
17th-century Irish writers